Luyten's Star  (GJ 273) is a red dwarf in the constellation Canis Minor located at a distance of approximately  from the Sun. It has a visual magnitude of 9.9, making it too faint to be viewed with the unaided eye. It is named after Willem Jacob Luyten, who, in collaboration with Edwin G. Ebbighausen, first determined its high proper motion in 1935. The star has two confirmed planets and two candidate planets, of which Luyten b is in the circumstellar habitable zone.

Properties
This star is approximately a quarter the mass of the Sun and has 35% of the Sun's radius. Luyten's Star is at the maximum mass at which a red dwarf can be fully convective, which means that most if not all of the star forms an extended convection zone. It has a stellar classification of M3.5V, with the V luminosity class indicating this is a main-sequence star that is generating energy through the thermonuclear fusion of hydrogen at its core. The projected rotation rate of this star is too low to be measured, but can be no greater than 1 km/s. Measurements of periodic variation in surface activity suggest a leisurely rotation period of roughly 116 days (which would give a velocity of ~0.15 km/s). The effective temperature of the star's outer envelope is a relatively cool 3,150 K, giving the star the characteristic red-orange hue of an M-type star.

At present, Luyten's Star is moving away from the Solar System. The closest approach occurred about 13,000 years ago when it came within 3.67 parsecs. The star is currently located 1.2 light years distant from Procyon, which would appear as a visual magnitude −4.5 star in the night sky of Luyten's Star's planets. However, Luyten's Star would only have an apparent magnitude of 4.6 from Procyon's sky because it is much less luminous. The closest encounter between the two stars occurred about 600 years ago when Luyten's Star was at its minimal distance of about 1.12 ly from Procyon. The space velocity components of Luyten's Star are U = +16, V = −66 and W = −17 km/s.

Planetary system

In March 2017, two candidate planets were discovered orbiting Luyten's Star. The outer planet, GJ 273b, is a super-Earth in its star's optimistic habitable zone. The inner planet, GJ 273c, is one of the lightest exoplanets detected by radial velocities, with a mass of only  However, it orbits much further in, with an orbital period of only 

GJ 273b is one of the closest known planets in its star's habitable zone.

Both planets are near 4:1 resonance; it is possible that, with still undiscovered ones, the entire inner part of this system is trapped in a single simple-mean-motion resonance chain like TRAPPIST-1.

In 2019, two more candidate planets were detected by radial velocity, making a potential total of four known planets in the system.

In October 2017, "Sónar Calling GJ273b", a project by METI and the Sónar music festival, transmitted a series of radio signals towards Luyten's star from a radar antenna at Ramfjordmoen, Norway. The signal consisted of a scientific and mathematical tutorial on how to decode the messages and was accompanied by 33 encoded musical compositions by various musicians. A second signal series was transmitted in May 2018. Were anyone listening, the soonest response would be received by 2042.

See also
 List of nearest stars and brown dwarfs

Notes

References

External links
 
  
 

Local Bubble
M-type main-sequence stars
Canis Minor
036208
0273
BD+05 1668
Planetary systems with four confirmed planets